SKAM Austin is an American teen drama streaming television series, based on the Norwegian television series Skam created by Julie Andem. It premiered with its first full episode on April 27, 2018 on Facebook Watch.

Employing the same distribution method and overall storylines as the original Norwegian production, SKAM Austin is shown in real-time through short clips on a daily basis on Facebook Watch, supplemented with screenshots of messages between the characters and compiled clips into full episodes on weekends. Real social media accounts created for the fictional characters allow viewers greater insight into the show beyond its clips. The first of these short clips was released on April 24, 2018.

On July 25, 2018, it was announced that Facebook had renewed the series for a second season. The second season premiered on March 15, 2019.

Premise
SKAM Austin focuses on the lives of a group of students attending Bouldin High School in Austin, Texas. The first season focuses on Megan Flores, who is forced to deal with the consequences of her relationship with Marlon, as well as the loss of her best friend, Abby, the captain of Bouldin High's dance team, the Kittens. The second season focuses on Grace Olsen, who struggles with her feelings for Daniel Williamson, Bouldin High's popular football captain, causing her to question her own beliefs as a feminist and putting her friendships in peril.

Cast and characters

Main
 Julie Rocha as Megan Flores, the main protagonist of Season 1, as well as Marlon's former girlfriend as of Season 2, and Grace's closest friend. Megan is initially introduced as isolated from her peers, mostly due to her relationship with Marlon. Throughout the first season, she struggles to trust him, due to his former relationship with her old best friend, Abby, while also forming new friendships with Grace, Kelsey, Jo, and Zoya. Things come to a head when Megan is forced to deal with the consequences of her relationship and their trust issues, and the two ultimately break up. However, Marlon and Megan remain friends during the second season and she resumes her friendship with Abby. Throughout the second season, Megan is shown to be partying a lot in an effort to get over Marlon, who seems to have moved on; however, the two are implied to have reunited during the latter half of the season. It is strongly implied throughout Grace's season that Megan might be struggling with alcoholism, though this is never addressed. 
 Kennedy Hermansen as Grace Olsen, the main protagonist of Season 2, as well as Daniel's romantic interest and Megan's best friend. Grace is introduced as a new student who has moved from Dallas, Texas, due to issues with her parents. She is revealed to live with her cousin, a lesbian named Eve and an unseen aunt, who is revealed to be a musician. During the second season, Grace struggles with her feelings for Daniel, causing her to question her own beliefs as a feminist. Grace is seen as the most sensible of her group of friends, usually appearing as the voice of reason when the time calls for it. She later discovers she might have been sexually assaulted by Daniel's brother, Clay, causing cracks to form in their relationship, though Clay later reveals nothing happened when Grace threatens him. She confides in an online friend who was present on the night of Clay's party, who turns out to be Shay's best friend, Tyler. 
 Till Simon as Marlon Frazier, Megan's romantic interest and former boyfriend, as well as a rising musician. He is introduced as having progressive beliefs, and is initially frustrated by Megan's desire to participate in school-sponsored events, such as dances and Talent Night. Marlon's parents are also hinted to be disapproving of his wish to focus on music, rather than his studies. He and Megan remain on good terms during the second season, as his music career with his best friends, Shay and Tyler, seems to grow. He attempts to move on from Megan by beginning a relationship with an older girl named Krystal, but is implied to start things up with Megan again. 
 Austin Terry as Daniel Williamson, Grace's romantic interest, who initially appears as a popular and shallow athlete. He takes Kelsey's virginity in the first season, only to reject further advances from her later on. During the first and second season, Daniel makes numerous advances towards Grace, until the two eventually go on a date. They later spend the night with each other following a party at Daniel's home, where he reveals his parents are separated and his brother goes to school in Dallas. It is hinted Daniel's unapproachable attitude is mostly due to the neglect of his parents, as well as his difficult relationship with his older brother, Clay. 
 Shelby Surdam as Kelsey Russell, Josefina's best friend; Kelsey is a self-conscious girl hinted to suffer from an eating disorder, most likely bulimia. She forms her own dance team after being rejected by the Kittens in the first season. She later joins the Kittens in Season 02. During the second season, she is forced to deal with unrequited feelings for Daniel, who is interested in Grace. It is later revealed that Kelsey was led on by Daniel, who only pursued a relationship with her to get closer to Grace, causing Kelsey to feel betrayed when Grace reveals the truth to her. 
 La'Keisha Slade as Shay Dixon, Marlon's childhood best friend and a close friend of Megan's. During the first season, Shay destroys the relationship between Megan and Marlon in an effort to get close to Megan, whom she has unrequited romantic feelings for. In the final episode of Season 1, Shay is revealed to be a lesbian. However, in Season 2 she begins dating Nic, a student who works on the Bouldin Beat with Grace. He later breaks up with her after Megan kisses her at Jordan's fundraiser party, though Shay later reveals she actually broke up with him. During the season finale, Shay forms an interest in Grace's cousin, Eve.
 Valeria Vera as Josefina Valencia, Kelsey's best friend, who does makeup tutorials. She is Hispanic and expresses her love for her culture through makeup and fashion. Jo is eccentric and is seen as the comedic one of the group. During the second season, Jo goes home with Jordan during his fundraiser party, though it is implied that nothing happened between the two. However, Jordan later expresses interest in her, but discovers she is dating a boy named Damien who she met through Instagram. 
 Aaliyah Muhammad as Zoya Ali, a no-nonsense Muslim girl who joins Kelsey's dance team. She appears to be closest with Jo, and is usually forced to deal with prejudices and ignorance due to her faith and culture. During the second season, Zoya is romantically pursued by Hunter Tomlinson, Abby's ex and a popular football player, leading to her being bullied by the Kittens, who also suspect she is responsible for them being discovered for cheating on exams. Later in the season, Hunter is revealed to have only wanted to hook up with Zoya, when she asks him to the school's prom, though he hints it might be due to his parents' prejudiced beliefs about Muslims.
 Giovanni Niubo as Tyler Nunez, Shay's closest friend, who is revealed to be gay during the second season. He is usually seen as an instigator between Marlon, Megan, and Shay, and heavily dislikes Megan, due to the heartache she causes Shay. During the second season, Tyler is revealed to be suffering from depression and reaches out to Grace, who is unaware of his true identity, on a fake Instagram account, clarifying the details of what happened the night of Clay's party.

Recurring
 Sydney Chandler as Eve, Grace's eccentric and artistic cousin, who is a lesbian. She is introduced during the second season and pushes Grace to try new things. She forms an interest in Shay after attending one of Marlon's concerts with Grace and Megan. 
 Pedro Castaneda as Jordan Diaz, Daniel's best friend, and a popular athlete who pursues Megan during the first season, though he is later revealed to be in a relationship with Cleo. He goes home with Jo during his fundraiser party during the second season, though it is implied nothing happened between them. 
 Sophia Hopkins as Abigail Heyward, Megan's former best friend and the captain of Bouldin High's Kittens. She spends the first season bullying Megan and her friends, before shifting her attention to Zoya, due to her jealousy over Zoya's romantic relationship with her ex, Hunter. 
 Praveena Javvadi as Poonam Para, a friend of the group's who works on the Bouldin Beat with Grace; she is involved in numerous extracurricular activities and usually speaks with a deadpan tone of voice. Grace invites her to join the dance team during the second season, but she declines.
 William Magnuson as Hunter Tomlinson, Zoya's romantic interest during Season 2, as well as another of Abby's exes. He is a good friend of Daniel and Jordan's. 
 Chawan Welch as Damian, Jo's second love interest who she meets over Instagram, due to her viral cupcake videos. They meet during the season finale at Grace and Daniel's party. 
 Kenah Benefield as Nic, a student who works on the Bouldin Beat newspaper with Grace and Poonam. He is introduced during the second season and is in a relationship with Shay, though they break up when Megan forcibly kisses Shay.
 Jacob Audirsch as Clay Williamson, Daniel's older brother, who has a seemingly difficult relationship with his younger brother. He is implied to have sexually assaulted Grace during the latter half of Season 2, only to reveal that nothing happened and it was only a misunderstanding when Grace threatens to report him to the police. 
 Sandra Avila as Megan's Mom, who is seen as more sensible than her husband, with whom she is heard constantly arguing.
 Sydney Cope as Cleo, Jordan's former girlfriend. She bullies and physically attacks Megan when she learns Jordan cheated on her. 
 Ray Perez as Megan's Dad, who pushes Megan to try new things and never give up on her hopes and dreams.

Guest
 Julia Blackmon as Eliza W ("Week 1")

Episodes

Series overview

Season 1 (2018)

Season 2 (2019)

Production

Background
In the third quarter of 2016, the Norwegian teen drama series Skam gained significant momentum and an active fan base outside its Norwegian borders. The series became particularly notable for its unique distribution model of individual short clips uploaded daily to the broadcast network's website in real-time as events unfolded in the show's narrative, with the clips shown during a week combined into one episode. On the website, the clips were supplemented with screenshots of text messages between the characters, while real social media accounts were created for the fictional characters to interact with each other. Through its four-season, 43-episode run, Skam explored themes including loneliness, identity, eating disorders, sexual assault, homosexuality, mental health, religion and forbidden love.

Development
In December 2016, Simon Fuller's production company XIX Entertainment signed a deal with NRK, the Norwegian Broadcasting Corporation, to produce an English-speaking adaptation of the Norwegian series. Fuller told The Guardian that "Skam is an important show. [...] There is precious little content created primarily for a teen audience and Skam provides this with great honesty and integrity. The show packs a punch and is leading the way in exploring multiplatform storytelling." The New York Times wrote that the American version will introduce new characters and actors, but retain the original storytelling format, with consultation from NRK. Fuller told the Times that "We are exploring all content outlets. [...] Shame works across all platforms and that is what gives it a point of difference. We are looking to innovate and push the boundaries of how modern content is viewed and experienced". Swedish news publication Svenska Dagbladet reported that principal photography would take place between the third and fourth quarters of 2017, with location scouting in progress to find an American city "most American youths can relate to", and with an expected premiere in late 2018.

In October 2017, during the MIPCOM annual trade show, it was announced that Facebook had acquired the rights to air then-titled Shame on its "Facebook Watch" original video platform. Facebook's head of creative global strategy Ricky Van Veen said that "When I first heard about Skam, it felt like I was seeing the future of storytelling. We're incredibly enthusiastic about bringing it to global audiences on Facebook Watch". At the time of the MIPCOM announcement, it was incorrectly reported that Julie Andem, the creator, writer and director of the original Skam series, would also produce the U.S. version, a message later retracted in Norwegian media, with a clarification of a misunderstanding due to a "busy morning" and that such a job "has been and is a dialogue between Julie Andem, Facebook and XIX Entertainment". In November 2017, Andem announced on her Instagram account that she would take the part as showrunner and director of Shame, writing that she "didn't want to give it to somebody else" despite the obstacles of a foreign country with different cultures than the original series.

On July 25, 2018, it was announced during the annual Television Critics Association's summer press tour that Facebook had renewed the series for a second season.

Casting
In November 2017, Andem's Instagram featured a poster for a casting call for teenagers in Austin, Texas, with casting bureau Vicky Boone confirming to Norwegian media publication Aftenposten that filming of the series would take place in the city of Austin.

Release
On April 19, 2018, the first short clips of the series were released, announcing April 24 as the official start of the series' daily releases. Social media accounts for some of the fictional characters had started posting content earlier, sometimes as far back as April 2017.

Reception
In a positive review, Den of Geeks Kayti Burt gave the first episode a rating of 3.5 out of 5 and described the series as a "a little bit like SKAM (the Norwegian teen drama upon which it's based), a little bit like Friday Night Lights, and a little bit like its own, wonderful thing." In another favorable critique, Common Sense Medias Joyce Slaton gave the series a rating of four out of five stars and compared it positively against other teen dramas saying, "It moves a bit slowly, true. But so does real life -- and though SKAM Austin is no vérité documentary, it reads a lot more authentic than Riverdale or 13 Reasons Why."

Solfrid Skaret of Norwegian news publication TV 2 opined that SKAM Austin was a "flop". She cited viewership figures, showing an initial premiere-episode audience of 11.9 million viewers, with substantial drops in subsequent episodes, down to approximately 771.800 viewers for the fifth episode, although acknowledging an uptick in ratings for the sixth episode. Commenting on the developments, John Magnus Dahl, a Skam researcher at the University of Bergen, told TV 2 that it was an "incredibly sad development". He further stated that SKAM Austin is "a good series that has reached a lot of people, but the problem is that they haven't been able to keep people's attention", and reasoned that the lack of interest may be caused by the story. "That the story is identical to the Norwegian success is probably disappointing to some people. There are no surprise moments." Christopher Pahle of Norwegian press publication Dagbladet objected to Skaret's article and specifically its negative outlook of the show's performance. Pahle explained that, while the viewership numbers were objective and factual, SKAM Austin could not accurately be compared to the rest of the television industry due to its distribution on Facebook's new video platform, where Austins audience numbers might be within expectations and the initial premiere rating could be heavily inflated due to a high volume of one-time viewers tempted to test the new service rather than dedicated viewers. The reporter also wrote that the original Norwegian production's success had also become its own worst enemy, elaborating that Skam itself did not have high ratings in its first season, was released stealthily to avoid older generations, and that the high expectations set forth by the Norwegian series' popularity meant news media might unfairly consider anything short of a total success a failure.

Slates Inkoo Kang described the series' heavy use of Facebook services as a questionable action, dubbing the series "both innovative teen drama" and an "advertisement for Facebook". The report noted that while Skam also employed social media actively in its plot, Austins characters have constant presence and common interactions through Facebook, Facebook Messenger, and Instagram, all owned by Facebook, while competing social networks Snapchat and YouTube are only mentioned, never shown. The article also noted that Snapchat, Facebook's "rival for the hearts and thumbs of America’s youth", was used as the platform of choice for a storyline involving the potential dissemination of a graphic image of blood on sheets, and that the distinctive sounds of instant messages through Facebook's Messenger service served as an "unofficial soundtrack". The article described the show's situation as "vaguely alarming", a "glamorization" of Facebook, as a contribution to the "normalization of the company’s grip on high-schoolers’ social lives", and that "content has seldom felt so indistinguishable from marketing".

References

External links

Facebook Watch original programming
2010s American high school television series
2010s American teen drama television series
2018 American television series debuts
English-language television shows
Television shows set in Austin, Texas
Television shows filmed in Texas
American television series based on Norwegian television series
American teen drama web series
Television series about teenagers
2010s American LGBT-related drama television series